Tshakhuma Tsha Madzivhandila Football Club (often known as TTM F.C.) is a South African professional football club based in the town of Thohoyandou in the Limpopo province. The team plays its home matches at the Thohoyandou Stadium.

The club purchased the National First Division status of Milano United F.C. in July 2017. The club had previously played in the ABC Motsepe League.

Under owner Lawrence Mulaudzi, the club continued to spend its way to the top when in 2020 it purchased the Premier League status of Bidvest Wits, and played in the 2020–21 South African Premier Division. In 2021 they sold their Premier League status to Marumo Gallants, and currently play in the National First Division.

In December 2020, CEO Sello Chokoe was accused of fraud and of stealing over R2 million from the club, and was suspended pending a hearing. Sello continued to receive a full salary, and repeatedly avoided a hearing by submitting a sick note on the days before.

Seven months after the purchase, with the club in financial difficulties, last in the league, and with players striking after salaries were unpaid, the club was sold to a pharmaceuticals consortium.

New chairman Abram Sello announced that the club's name would change at the end of the season, though he expected it to remain in Limpopo.

Honours

Cup competitions

Nedbank Cup
Winners  (1): 2020–21

References 

Premier Soccer League clubs
Soccer clubs in Limpopo